Bitter Rivals is the third studio album by American noise pop duo Sleigh Bells. It was released on October 4, 2013 by Mom + Pop Music. The title track was released as the album's lead single on September 3, 2013, with a music video released the day before. The album was made exclusively available for streaming on Rolling Stones website on October 1, 2013. It was partially inspired by Janet Jackson, with the song "Tiger Kit" referencing Jackson's "Rhythm Nation".

Composition

Music and lyrics 
Philip Cosores of Consequence of Sound described Alexis Kraus' vocals on the record as leaning "heavily" on the "hip-hop cadence" of Sleigh Bells' previous albums "to go along with [Kraus'] inked-up bubblegum melodies". Cosores also described the album's musical styles as nostalgic, featuring "nu metal serving as a warning for pop punk, and freestyle, and whatever else might next resurface".

Critical reception 

At Metacritic, which assigns a normalized rating out of 100 to reviews from mainstream critics, the album received an average score of 70 based on 27 reviews, which indicates "generally favorable reviews".

Philip Cosores of Consequence of Sound compared the album to nu metal bands such as Korn, Limp Bizkit, and Staind, who all had "a similar pattern of three albums into the spotlight, [with] their third being a success in terms of attention, but also a signifier of the end of people caring in quite the same way". Cosores also felt that the album played to Sleigh Bells' strength, but mostly felt "stuck in the weaker aspects of their previous albums, busying up the mercifully brief tracks with unnecessary filler".

Track listing

Personnel
Credits adapted from the liner notes of Bitter Rivals.

Sleigh Bells
 Alexis Krauss – vocals
 Derek E. Miller – all instruments

Additional musicians
 Kevin Osborne – whistling on "To Hell With You"

Production and recording
 Chris Athens – mastering
 Andrew Dawson – mixing, additional production on "Young Legends"
 Will Hubbard – executive producer
 Derek E. Miller – production
 Shane Stoneback – engineering, recording, additional production

Artwork and design
 Steve Attardo – design, layout
 Derek Miller – art direction, original photography

Charts

Weekly charts

Release history

References

2013 albums
Mom + Pop Music albums
Sleigh Bells (band) albums